Soylent, produced by Soylent Nutrition, Inc., is an American company that produces meal replacement products in powder, shake, and bar forms. The company was founded in 2013 and is headquartered in Los Angeles, California.

Soylent is named after a food in Make Room! Make Room!, a dystopian science fiction novel (which was the basis of the movie Soylent Green) that explores themes of population growth and limited resources.

The company developed a following initially in Silicon Valley and received early financial backing from GV, the investment arm of Alphabet, Inc., and venture capital firm Andreessen Horowitz. In 2021, the company announced it had become profitable starting in 2020.

History 

In January 2013, American software engineer Rob Rhinehart purchased 35 chemical ingredients—including potassium gluconate, calcium carbonate, monosodium phosphate, maltodextrin, olive oil—all of which he deemed to be necessary for survival, based on his readings of biochemistry textbooks and U.S. government websites. Rhinehart used to view food as a time-consuming hassle and had resolved to treat it as an engineering problem. He blended the ingredients with water and consumed only this drink for the next thirty days. Over the course of the next two months, he adjusted the proportions of the ingredients to counter various health issues and further refined the formula. Rhinehart claimed a host of health benefits from the drink and noted that it had greatly reduced his monthly food bill, which fell from about US$470 to $155, and the time spent behind the preparation and consumption of food while providing him greater control over his nutrition.

Rhinehart's blog posts about his experiment attracted attention on Hacker News, eventually leading to a crowdfunding campaign on Tilt that raised about $1.5 million in preorders aimed at moving the powdered drink from concept into production. Media reports detailed how operations began for Soylent Nutrition, Inc. in April 2014, using a relatively small $500 system to ship the first $2.6 million worth of product. In January 2015, Soylent received $20 million in Series A round funding, led by venture capital firm Andreessen Horowitz. In 2017 the company raised $50 million in venture funding. In 2023, Soylent was acquired by Starco Foods, the third Starco acquisition in 6 months.

Soylent is named after a food in Harry Harrison's 1966 science fiction novel Make Room! Make Room! In the novel, most types of soylent are made from soy and lentils, hence the name of the product, a combination of "soy" and "lent". The word also evokes the 1973 film adaptation Soylent Green, in which the eponymous food is made from human remains. Rhinehart also says he chose the name, with its morbid associations, to pique curiosity and deeper investigation, since the name was clearly not chosen with a traditionally "flashy" marketing scheme in mind.

Distribution
Soylent was only available for purchase and shipment within the United States until June 15, 2015, when the shipping to Canada began. In October 2017, Canada disallowed further shipments of Soylent due to a failure to meet Canadian food regulations on meal replacements. Shipments to Canada resumed in 2020.

In July 2017, 7-Eleven stores in and around Los Angeles became the first offline venues to sell Soylent. By April 2018, Soylent was sold in over 8,000 U.S. 7-Elevens and was available at Walmart, Target, Kroger, and Meijer. By 2021, over 28,000 retail stores carried the product.

Health effects
The makers of Soylent claim it contains the nutrients necessary for a healthy lifestyle.

Some people have experienced gastrointestinal problems from consumption of Soylent, particularly flatulence.

Lead and cadmium content

On August 13, 2015, As You Sow filed a notice of intent to pursue a lawsuit against the makers of Soylent, claiming that Soylent was in breach of California's Proposition 65 for not adequately labelling its product given the levels of lead and cadmium present in the drink. Although Soylent contains levels of lead and cadmium far below the national safety levels set by the FDA, it does contain 12 to 25 times the level of lead and 4 times the level of cadmium permitted in California without additional labeling. A lawyer who has worked on settlements of Proposition 65 suits described the case as "alarmist", as the levels are well below FDA limits of what is allowed in food products. However, as Soylent is marketed as a complete meal replacement, many customers consume the drinks three times a day, equating to 36 to 75 times the lead and 12 times the level of cadmium without the Prop 65 label.

Soylent's website displays the Proposition 65 warning required by California. Soylent Nutrition, Inc. published the position that the levels of heavy metal content in Soylent "are in no way toxic, and Soylent remains completely safe and nutritious". Soylent Nutrition, Inc. also published an infographic and spreadsheet based on an FDA study of heavy metal content in common foods, comparing two selected example meals to servings of Soylent with a similar amount of caloric intake. Both of the company's chosen comparison meals include high levels of cadmium and arsenic, along with levels of lead similar to those of Soylent; although one of them includes tuna and the other includes salmon, providing over 97% of the arsenic in each proposed meal, with spinach providing 74% of the cadmium in the higher-cadmium meal and fruit cocktail providing 71% of the lead in the higher-lead meal.

Kidney Stones
Soylent has been linked to an increased risk of kidney stones. Kidney stones are hard deposits that form in the kidneys when there is an accumulation of substances, such as oxalate, in the urine. High levels of oxalate, which is found in soy, can increase the risk of developing kidney stones. Soylent may cause gastrointestinal weakness since the digestive system needs to do less work to break down solid foods; this weakness may eventually cause the endocrine system to become overloaded and form kidney stones.

Since Soylent is marketed as a meal replacement, consumers of Soylent may be inclined to overly rely on it. However, Soylent is not a substitute for a varied and nutritious diet that includes a variety of fresh fruits, vegetables, whole grains, lean proteins, and healthy fats. Over-reliance on Soylent can lead to nutrient deficiencies, as the drink may not provide all of the essential vitamins, minerals, and other nutrients that the body needs. This dietary imbalance can further risk the chance of developing kidney stones.

Product recalls
In 2016, the company announced it would halt sales of the Soylent Bar due to reports of gastrointestinal illness, including nausea, vomiting, and diarrhea. The company asked customers to discard any unconsumed bars and said it would offer full refunds. On October 21, 2016, the company triggered a product recall.

On October 27, 2016, the company also halted sales of Soylent Powder. The company said tests on the bar had not shown contamination but also said that some powder users had reported stomach-related symptoms from consuming the powder.

The company initially suspected soy or sucralose intolerance. However, on November 7, 2016, Soylent instead blamed algal flour for making people sick and said it planned to remove algal flour from future formulations of the powders and bars, which it did in the next formulation version 1.7 introduced on December 15, 2016. The drink-based products use algal oil, not algal flour, so were deemed to be safe for users.

Reviews 

Soylent has gone through multiple iterations since its release, which have significantly changed the flavor, texture, and nutritional ingredients.

Rhinehart called the flavor of the original versions "minimal", "broad" and "nonspecific". 
Soylent 1.0 contains soy lecithin and sucralose as masking flavors and to adjust appearance, texture and smell.
Before version 1.4, vanillin was included as an ingredient for flavoring.

Dylan Matthews of The Washington Post noted in 2013 that Soylent fulfills a similar need as medical foods like Abbott Laboratories' Jevity but at a much lower cost.

Reviews on the taste of powdered Soylent vary. Writing for The Verge, Chris Ziegler said he was "pleasantly surprised" with the "rich, creamy, and strangely satisfying" flavor, and a reviewer for Business Insider likened it to a vanilla milkshake with the texture of pancake batter, while a writer for The Guardian wrote that it was "purposefully bland", "vile" and made the taster "gag".

Farhad Manjoo of The New York Times said he "found Soylent to be a punishingly boring, joyless product". Chris Ziegler of The Verge, who experimented with subsisting only on Soylent for almost a month, said that although he liked and "never really tired of the flavor", he still concluded that "Soylent isn't living, it's merely surviving", and described the apple he ate at the end of that period as "my first meal back from the abyss" and the best he'd ever had in his life. A writer for Gawker said he "was having trouble getting it down", and eventually "dumped the whole thing in the sink".

Both Manjoo and Ziegler said they had experienced some gastrointestinal problems from drinking it. Lee Hutchinson of Ars Technica also reported a brief period of "adaptation gas" at the beginning of a four-day experiment.

The mocha-flavored version has been described as similar to a "caffeinated Nesquik drink".

See also 

 Meal replacement
 Nutritionism
 Protein shake
 Therapeutic food

References

External links 

 

Products introduced in 2013
Dietary supplements
Vegetarian diets